The City School District of Albany (also known as the Albany City School District) is the public school district of Albany, New York. The district is an independent public entity. It is governed by the City School District of Albany Board of Education, whose members are elected in non-partisan elections for staggered, four-year terms. The board selects a superintendent, who is the district's chief administrative official. The district's offices are located in the Old Albany Academy Building at Academy Park. It publishes a seasonal newsletter called Capital Education.

The district has eleven elementary schools, four middle schools, one comprehensive high school, and several other programs of various types, including alternative-education programs in grades 7-12 at the Tony Clement Center for Education, and the Albany International Center, which serves English-language learners in grades 6-12. The 2018-2019 school year saw enrollment at 10,068

Schools

High schools
 Albany High School- comprehensive high school) (Grade 9-Grade 12), which includes the Abrookin Vocational-Technical Center

Middle schools
Stephen and Harriet Myers Middle School (Grade 6-Grade 8)
 Edmund J. O'Neal Middle School of Excellence (Grade 6-Grade 8)
 William S. Hackett Middle School (Grade 6-Grade 8)
 North Albany Middle School (new program starting with Grade 6; building formerly housed PS 20 & N. Albany Academy)

Elementary schools
 Albany School of Humanities (ASH) (formerly Public School 23)(Pre K-Grade 6)
 Arbor Hill Elementary Community School (Pre K- Grade 5)
 Delaware Community School (formerly Public School 18) ( Pre K- Grade 5, including the Dual Language Program)
 Eagle Point Elementary School (formerly Public School 27) (Pre K- Grade 6)
 Giffen Memorial Elementary School (Pre K- Grade 6)
 Montessori Magnet School (Pre K- Grade 5)
 New Scotland Elementary (formerly Public School 19) (Pre K- Grade 5)
 Philip J. Schuyler Achievement Academy (Pre K- Grade 5) (in the building of former Public School 21)
 Pine Hills Elementary School (formerly Public School 16) (Pre K- Grade 5)
 Sheridan Preparatory Academy (Pre K-Grade 5)
 Thomas O'Brien Academy of Science and Technology (TOAST) (formerly Public School 24) (Pre K- Grade 6)

Other
 Albany International Center (Grade 6 - Grade 12)
 Tony Clement Center for Education (Grade 7- Grade 12)

Board of Education
There are seven board members, elected in May in conjunction the annual school budget vote. Board members serve staggered four-year terms, which expire on June 30.  Officers are elected by the members. Current board members, as of February 2020:

 Anne Savage(President)
 Vickie Smith (Vice President)
 Tabetha Wilson (Secretary)
 Damarise Alexander-Mann
 Sridar Chittur, Ph.D.
 Ellen Krejci 
 Hassan Elminyawi

Recent superintendents

 1975–82: David Bray
 1982–1989: David Brown
 1989–94: John Bach
 1994–96: Arthur "Sam" Walton
 1996–1997: Eleanor Bartlett (interim)
 1997–2003: Lonnie Palmer
 2003–04: Michael Johnson
 2004–09: Eva C. Joseph, Ed.D.
 2009–2012: Raymond Colucciello, Ed.D.
 2012–2016: Marguerite Vanden Wyngaard, Ph.D.
 2016-2017: Kimberly Young Wilkins, Ed.D. (interim)
 2017–2022: Kaweeda G. Adams
2023          John Yagielski (Interim)

References

External links

 

Education in Albany, New York
School districts established in 1830
School districts in New York (state)
1830 establishments in New York (state)
Organizations based in Albany, New York